Valeri Dmitriyevich Gassy (April 22, 1949, Ukraine – February 1, 2004) was a Soviet/Ukraine handball player who competed in the 1972 Olympics and in the 1976 Olympics. He was born in Kolomyia (today in Ukraine).

He played at Burevestnik Krasnodar and at CSKA Moscow (1973–1974). In 1972 he was part of the Soviet team which finished fifth. He played all six matches and scored twelve goals.

Four years later he won the gold medal with the Soviet team. He played five matches including the final and scored 25 goals. At the 1978 World Championship he also won a silver medal.

References

External links

1949 births
2004 deaths
Soviet male handball players
Ukrainian male handball players
Handball players at the 1972 Summer Olympics
Handball players at the 1976 Summer Olympics
Olympic handball players of the Soviet Union
Olympic gold medalists for the Soviet Union
Armed Forces sports society athletes
Burevestnik (sports society) athletes
Olympic medalists in handball
People from Kolomyia
Medalists at the 1976 Summer Olympics
Sportspeople from Ivano-Frankivsk Oblast